Wuxu is an urban town in Jinchengjiang District, Hechi, Guangxi, China. The Jinchengjiang Industrial Cluster, established in 2009, is situated in Wuxu.  Wuxu has the jurisdictions over Wuxu Residential Community and the following nine villages:
Sanjing Village
Longma Village
Nagan Village
Pingqiao Village
Tangjiang Village
Chaojiao Village
Tangzhou Village
Banluan Village
Bawang Village

References 

Towns of Hechi